Stephanus Cosimi, C.R.S. (27 September 1629 – 10 May 1707) was a Roman Catholic prelate who served as Archbishop of Split (1678–1707).

Biography
Stephanus Cosimi was born in Venice, Italy on 27 September 1629 and ordained a priest in the Ordo Clericorum Regularium a Somascha. On 5 September 1678, he was appointed during the papacy of Pope Innocent XI as Archbishop of Split. On 18 September 1678, he was consecrated bishop by Alessandro Crescenzi (cardinal), Bishop of Recanati e Loreto, with Domenico Gianuzzi, Titular Bishop of Dioclea in Phrygia, and Bartolomeo Menatti, Bishop of Lodi, serving as co-consecrators. He served as Archbishop of Split until his death on 10 May 1707.

Episcopal succession
While bishop, he was the principal co-consecrator of:
Giorgio Emo, Archbishop of Corfu (1688); 
Giovanni Vusich, Bishop of Nona (1688); and 
Stefano Cupilli, Bishop of Trogir (1699).

References

External links and additional sources
 (for Chronology of Bishops) 
 (for Chronology of Bishops) 

17th-century Roman Catholic bishops in Croatia
Bishops appointed by Pope Innocent XI
1629 births
1707 deaths
Republic of Venice clergy
Somascan bishops